London Grove is an unincorporated community in West Marlborough Township in Chester County, Pennsylvania, United States. London Grove is located at the intersection of Pennsylvania Route 926 and Newark Road north of Avondale. There was a blacksmithshop (at the middle of the intersection) and a general store, now the parking lot for an apartment building.

References

External links

Unincorporated communities in Chester County, Pennsylvania
Unincorporated communities in Pennsylvania